Katrin Reinert (born 13 January 1988 in Stuttgart) is a German rower.

References
 
 

1988 births
Living people
German female rowers
Sportspeople from Heilbronn
Rowers at the 2008 Summer Olympics
Olympic rowers of Germany
European Rowing Championships medalists
21st-century German women
20th-century German women